Crocker's sea snake (Laticauda crockeri) is a species of venomous snake in the subfamily Hydrophiinae of the family Elapidae. The species is native to Oceania.

Etymology
The specific name, crockeri, is in honor of American railroad magnate Charles Templeton Crocker (1885-1948), who allowed the California Academy of Sciences to use his yacht, the Zaca, for scientific expeditions.

Geographic range
L. crockeri is endemic to a single brackish lake (Lake Te-Nggano) on Rennell Island in the Solomon Islands.

Description
L. crockeri is sexually dimorphic, with females growing to be longer and heavier than males.

Conservation status
L. crockeri is currently listed as "Vulnerable" by the International Union for Conservation of Nature (IUCN) due to the extremely limited distribution of the species.

References

Further reading
Slevin JR (1934). "The Templeton Crocker Expedition to Western Polynesian and Melanesian Islands, 1933. Notes on the Reptiles and Amphibians, with the Description of a New Species of Sea-snake". Proceedings of the California Academy of Sciences 21 (15) 183–188. (Laticauda crockeri, new species, p. 186).

Reptiles of the Solomon Islands
Laticauda
Endemic fauna of the Solomon Islands
Reptiles described in 1934
Taxa named by Joseph Richard Slevin
Taxonomy articles created by Polbot